The United States District Court for the District of Nevada (in case citations, D. Nev.)  is the federal district court whose jurisdiction is the state of Nevada. The court has locations in Las Vegas and Reno.

Cases from the District of Nevada are appealed to the United States Court of Appeals for the Ninth Circuit (except for patent claims and claims against the U.S. government under the Tucker Act, which are appealed to the Federal Circuit).

The United States Attorney's Office for the District of Nevada represents the United States in civil and criminal litigation in the court. , the United States Attorney is Jason Frierson.

Current judges 

:

Former judges

Chief judges

Succession of seats

Courthouses

Las Vegas 

The Lloyd D. George Federal District Courthouse is the home for the district court in Las Vegas. The building of the courthouse was completed in 2002 and was the first federal building built to comply with the post-Oklahoma City blast resistance requirements. Blast-resistance tests for the project were conducted at the Department of Defense’s Large Blast Thermal Simulator (LBTS) in White Sands, New Mexico to validate building performance under blast loads.  The LBTS facility was designed, built, and equipped in the early 1990s to perform tests on structural models, vehicles, and components, subjected to simulated high pressures combined with high temperatures, as in a major blast.

On January 4, 2010, a single gunman, identified as Johnny Lee Wicks, aged 66, went inside the lobby of the courthouse and opened fire, fatally wounding Special Deputy U.S. Marshal Stanley Cooper who was on duty as a Court Security Officer. Wicks was killed by return fire from other security officers and U.S. Marshals. The Entry Rotunda is named in the Honor of Deputy Cooper and the City of Las Vegas named a street near the court in his honor as well. 

 Senators Harry Reid and John Ensign, both of whom had offices in the courthouse building, were not present when this happened. Wicks was apparently angry over the outcome of a legal dispute over his Social Security benefits.

Reno 
The Bruce R. Thompson Courthouse and Federal Building was completed in 1996. The building's primary tenants are the U.S. District Court, U.S. Marshals Service, U.S. Probation and Pretrial Services, Nevada Senators, and the Corporation for National Community Services.

See also 
 Courts of Nevada
 List of current United States district judges
 List of United States federal courthouses in Nevada

References

External links 
  United States District Court – District of Nevada

Nevada
Las Vegas
Reno, Nevada
1865 establishments in Nevada
Courthouses in Nevada
Courts and tribunals established in 1865